Rana is an Indian Surname of Sanskrit origin meaning "king" in South Asian languages and is the masculine derivative of the Sanskrit word "rānī" meaning "queen". It was commonly used as a princely title by the Nepalese Rana dynasty and by Rajput kings that ruled under a Maharana in the Indian subcontinent. It is today more commonly used as a surname among Rajputs in Rajasthan, Uttarakhand, Gujarat, Haryana, Maharashtra, Himachal Pradesh, Jammu, Punjab and Madhya Pradesh. Some other variants of the name include Rani and Ranee as well as the surname Rane, which is more common in Goa and Maharashtra.

In Persian, Arabic, Turkish and Kurdish; the name means "eye-catching, glittering, mesmerising" and "elegant, graceful", stemming from the word yarnū, meaning "to gaze at longingly". It is a given name for females in Middle Eastern countries.

In Galician, it is a derivative of the surname Raña that may refer to someone from a place with the same name in A Coruña, Spain.

In Nordic countries, the name of Sámi origin means "green earth" or "fertile fields" after the mythological goddess Rana Niejta.

In Norse, the given name may refer to "nobility" or "queenly".

In Hebrew, the name may have the meaning "pure, clean".

In New Zealand, it is a given name for males of Māori origin. Less commonly, it is also a given name for females of English origin meaning "raven"

In Italian and Spanish, the nickname may refer to "frog", possibly stemming from Holarctic true frogs of the genus Rana.

In Japanese; the given name for females has multiple meanings depending on the choice of Kanji characters used, including "beautiful", "princess" or "serenity, harmony".

People with the name

Given name 
 Rana Abdelhamid (born 1993), Egyptian-American entrepreneur and self-defense activist
 Rana X. Adhikari (born 1974), American experimental physicist
 Rana Afzal Khan (1949–2019), Pakistani politician, finance minister and army officer
 Rana Ahmad Hamd (born 1985), Saudi-born women's rights activist
 Rana Azadivar (born 1983), Iranian actress
 Rana Bhagwandas (1942-2015), Pakistani jurist and former acting chief justice of the Supreme Court of Pakistan
 Rana Bokhari (born 1977), Canadian politician
 Rana Daggubati (born 1984), Indian actor, producer, TV personality, visual effects co-ordinator and photographer
 Rana Dajani, Jordanian molecular biologist
 Rana Dasgupta (born 1971), British-Indian novelist and essayist
 Rana Farhan, Iranian-American musician and singer of jazz and blues
 Rana Aylin Foroohar (born 1970), American journalist, economic analyst and author
 Rana Hussein (born 1969), daughter of Saddam Hussein
 Rana Javadi (born 1953), Iranian photographer
 Rana Mashood Ahmad Khan (born 1966), Pakistani politician, lawyer and former deputy speaker of the Punjab Assembly (Pakistan)
 Rana Mohammad Hanif Khan (c. 1922–2005), Pakistani politician and former finance minister
 Rana Muhammad Akram Khan (born 1962), Pakistani lawyer, landowner and former chairman executive of the Punjab Bar Council
 Rana Muhammad Iqbal Khan (born 1945), Pakistani politician and former speaker of the Punjab Assembly (Pakistan)
 Rana Mitter (born 1969), British historian, political scientist and Oxford University professor
 Rana Naved-ul-Hasan (born 1978), Pakistani cricketer
 Rana Nazeer Ahmed Khan (born 1949), Pakistani politician and lawyer
 Rana Pratap Singh I (1540-1597), 16th-century Rajput king of Mewar in present-day Rajasthan (India)
 Rana Sanaullah Khan (born 1950), Pakistani politician
 Rana KP Singh (born 1957), Indian politician and speaker of the Punjab Legislative Assembly (India)
 Rana Tanveer Hussain (born 1949), Pakistani politician and minister
 Rana Donald Waitai (1942–2021), New Zealand politician and lawyer

Surname
 Ashutosh Rana (born 1964), Indian actor, producer author and TV personality
 Azmat Rana (1951-2015), Pakistani cricketer
 Kaji Abhiman Singh Rana Magar (born 1846), Nepalese army general and minister
 Baber Shamsher Jang Bahadur Rana (1888-1960), Nepalese defence minister and member of the Rana dynasty
 Bakhtiar Rana (1910-1999), Pakistani army lieutenant general
 Bal Krishna Shamsher Jang Bahadur Rana (1903-1981), Nepalese playwright
 Balwinder Rana (born 1947), British activist
 Beatrice Rana (born 1993), Italian pianist
 Bhim Shumsher Jang Bahadur Rana (1865-1932), 14th Nepalese prime minister
 Bhim Singh Rana (c. 1707–1756), ruler of the princely state of Gohad (in present-day India)
 Bir Shumsher Jung Bahadur Rana (1852-1901), 11th Nepalese prime minister
 Chandra Shamsher Jang Bahadur Rana (1863–1929), 13th Nepalese prime minister
 Deepraj Rana, Indian actor
 Dev Shumsher Jung Bahadur Rana (1862-1914), 12th Nepalese prime minister
 Devyani Rana (born 1973); Nepalese princess
 Diamond Shumsher Rana (1918-2011), Nepalese storywriter and political activist
 Diljit Singh Rana, Baron Rana (born 1938), British politician and life peer of the House of Lords
 Gaurav Shumsher Jang Bahadur Rana (born 1955), Nepalese former chief of army staff and member of the Rana dynasty
 Gyanu Rana (born 1949), Nepalese singer and reality show judge
 Jaspal Rana (born 1976), Indian sport pistol shooter
 Juddha Shamsher Jang Bahadur Rana (1875-1952), 15th Nepalese prime minister
 Jung Bahadur Rana (1816–1877), 8th Nepalese prime minister and founder of the Rana dynasty
 Kaiser Shamsher Jang Bahadur Rana (1892-1964), Nepalese army field marshal
 Kashiram Rana (1938–2012), Indian politician
 Kiran Shamsher Jang Bahadur Rana (1916-1983), Nepalese army officer
 Kuber Singh Rana (born 1960), former inspector general of Nepal Police
 Luigi Rana (born 1986), Italian footballer
 Manjural Islam Rana (1984–2007), Bangladeshi cricketer
 Masood Rana (1938–1995), Pakistani playback singer
 Moammar Rana (born 1974), Pakistani actor and film director
 Mohan Shamsher Jang Bahadur Rana (1885–1967), 17th Nepalese prime minister and foreign minister
 Munawwar Rana (born 1952), Indian poet
 Nara Shumsher Jang Bahadur Rana (1911-2006), former chief of Nepal Police
 Naseem Rana (born 1942), Pakistani army lieutenant-general and former director-general of the Inter-Services Intelligence
 Natasha Rana, American founder and CEO of Symple Health
 Om Bikram Rana, former inspector general of Nepal Police
 Padma Shumsher Jang Bahadur Rana (1882-1961), 16th Nepalese prime minister
 Pashupati Shamsher Jang Bahadur Rana, Nepalese politician, former minister and member of the Rana dynasty
 Pradip Shumsher Jang Bahadur Rana, former inspector general of Nepal Police
 Ratna Shumsher Jang Bahadur Rana, former inspector general of Nepal Police
 Sardarsinhji Ravaji Rana (1870–1957), Indian political activist
 Santosh Rana (1942-2019), Indian politician
 Santosh Rana (CPI) (born 1948), Indian communist politician
 Shafqat Rana (born 1943), former Pakistani cricketer
 Shakoor Rana (1936-2001), Pakistani cricketer and umpire
 Sohail Rana (born 1938), Pakistani music composer for films and television
 Sohel Rana (born 1947), Bangladeshi actor, director and producer
 Sohel Rana (born 1977), Bangladeshi businessman
 Sohel Rana (footballer, born 1995), Bangladeshi footballer
 Sohel Rana (born 1996), Bangladeshi cricketer
 Subarna Shamsher Rana (1910-1977), 21st Nepalese prime minister
 Tahawwur Hussain Rana (born 1961), Pakistani-Canadian businessman and former physician
 Toran Shumsher Jung Bahadur Rana (born 1904), Nepalese army commander-in-chief and former inspector general of Nepal Police
 Udaya Shumsher Rana (born 1970), Nepalese politician, former minister and member of the Rana dynasty
Shammi Rana  (born 1978), Indian sports executive and administrator

Rana
 Jadi Rana, a person in the 1559 Zoroastrian epic poem Qissa-i Sanjan
 Rana Jashraj, a Hindu deity
 Rana Niejta, a goddess in Sámi mythology

See also
 Raña, Spanish surname
 Rane, Marathi surname
 Rani, feminine variant
 Ranee, feminine variant
 Rania

References

Surnames
Indian masculine given names
Pakistani masculine given names
Nepali-language surnames
Punjabi-language surnames
Bengali-language surnames
Arabic given names
Arabic feminine given names